Moon of Desire is a 2014 Philippine television drama romance fantasy series directed by FM Reyes and Raymund B. Ocampo, starring JC de Vera and Meg Imperial, with Ellen Adarna, Dominic Roque and Miko Raval. The series premiered on ABS-CBN's Kapamilya Gold afternoon block and worldwide on TFC from March 31, 2014, to August 15, 2014, replacing Galema: Anak ni Zuma. This is the last ABS-CBN drama series to be produced in standard definition or 4:3 aspect ratio, as the network's drama series that were released following this series are now all produced in high definition or 16:9 aspect ratio.

The series is streaming online on YouTube.

Synopsis
The story centers on Ayla and her famous FM radio program Moon of Desire. Everyone is talking about it because of the lovely, seductive and sexy voice that soothes the pain of those who are heart broken by the love advice she gives. But more than the talk about the radio program, the true mystery that hounds her listeners is the anonymity of the DJ herself. There is a clamor for DJ Ayla to show herself to her fans but she never does. This is because, behind the beautiful and captivating voice lies a secret. DJ Ayla is covered in hair from head to toe. She has a medical condition called Hypertrichosis.

Cast and characters

Protagonist
 Meg Imperial as Ayla "DJ Lav" Ricafrente-Bustamante / Angel Comia
 JC de Vera as Dr. Jefferson "Jeff Epoy" Bustamante

Lead  cast
 Ellen Adarna as Dra. Tamara Herrera
 Dominic Roque as Vince Regalado
 Miko Raval as Erron Angeles

Main cast
 Carmi Martin as Soledad Ricafrente
 Precious Lara Quigaman as Mia Ricafrente
 Beauty Gonzalez as Matilda Angela "Tilda" Comia-Ledesma 
 Devon Seron as Riri Bustamante
 Franco Daza as Nolan Ledesma
 Dawn Jimenez as Violet "DJ Violet" Mendoza
 Guji Lorenzana as Philip Acosta
 Perla Bautista as Amor Martinez

Supporting cast
 Bodjie Pascua as Abel Bustamante
 Chinggoy Alonzo as Robert Herrera
 Kevin Fowler as Runin Comia
 Benj Bolivar as Paco Mercader
 Djanin Cruz as Karen Custodio
 Peter Serrano as Pete Regalado
 Myrtle Sarrosa as Anise
 Karen Reyes as Chimmy
 Moi Bien as Maan
 AJ Dee as Caleb
 Alex Castro as Diego
 Dey-Dey Amansec as Popoy
 Mel Kimura as Luningning/Havana

Guest cast
 Arnold Reyes as Simon Bustamante
 Marina Benipayo as Dr. Ellen Chan
 Tanya Gomez as Esther
 Jason Abalos as Ulric
 Veyda Inoval as young Ayla
 Bugoy Cariño as young Jeff/ Epoy
 Sofia Millares as young Riri

Rerun

The series will be re-run soon to Jeepney TV.

See also
List of programs broadcast by ABS-CBN
List of telenovelas of ABS-CBN

References

External links 

ABS-CBN drama series
Philippine telenovelas
Fantaserye and telefantasya
2014 Philippine television series debuts
2014 Philippine television series endings
Philippine romance television series
Filipino-language television shows
Television shows set in the Philippines